Andrena nigroaenea   is a Palearctic species of mining bee.

References

External links
Images representing Andrena nigroaenea 

Hymenoptera of Europe
nigroaenea
Insects described in 1802